This page provides supplementary chemical data on sodium chloride.

Material safety data sheet  

The handling of this chemical may incur notable safety precautions. It is highly recommended that you seek the material safety data sheet (MSDS) for this chemical from a reliable source  such as eChemPortal, and follow its direction.

Structure and properties

Thermodynamic properties

Density data of aqueous solutions 

Note: ρ is density, n is refractive index at 589 nm, and η is viscosity, all at 20 °C; Teq is the equilibrium temperature between two phases: ice/liquid solution for Teq < 0–0.1 °C and NaCl/liquid solution for Teq above 0.1 °C.

Spectral data

References

External links
vapour pressure J Chem Thermod

Chemical data pages
Chemical data pages cleanup